Ángel Medardo Luzuriaga (14 September 1935 – 19 June 2018) was an Ecuadorian musical artist, precursor of the Andean cumbia.

Biography
Medardo was born in Loja on 14 September 1935, and in his music he extolled the beauty of the Ecuadorian territory, especially that of the province of Manabí. On 11 September 1967, he founded the orchestra "Don Medardo y sus Players", a group with which he had a record production of 105 albums. He died on June 19, 2018, at the age of 82 in the city of Quito

References

1935 births
2018 deaths
Ecuadorian musicians
Cumbia musicians
People from Loja, Ecuador